The Habeas Corpus Suspension Act 1799 (39 Geo. III, c. 15) was an Act of Parliament passed by the Parliament of Great Britain.

The Act renewed the suspension of habeas corpus from 9 January 1799 until 21 May 1799. Habeas corpus was again suspended on 20 May 1799 (39 Geo. III, c. 44) until 1 March 1800. This time the Act gave new powers to enable the dispersal, among several jails, of prisoners and detainees charged with treason, including Irish prisoners sent to Britain.

See also
Habeas Corpus Suspension Act (disambiguation)

Notes

Habeas corpus
Great Britain Acts of Parliament 1799